Scout Green is a hamlet and small area of farm land near the village of Tebay in Cumbria, England.

History

It is best known among railway enthusiasts as a location for trainspotting and  photography on the West Coast Main Line between Penrith and Oxenholme, and has been a popular vantage point on the railway since soon after the opening of this section of the Lancaster and Carlisle Railway in December 1846. Northbound steam hauled trains were often banked up the 1 in 75 gradient towards Shap whilst southbound trains can be observed accelerating downhill from summit at Shap Fell.  A signal box was located at Scout Green, but this was removed in the 1970s when then WCML was electrified.

An unusual feature of Scout Green is its access road — it involves travelling up a single track road which runs between the carriageways of the M6 motorway.

References

 Awdry, C., The Encyclopedia of British Railway Companies, 1990, Patrick Stephens Limited, 

Hamlets in Cumbria
Orton, Eden
Rail transport in Cumbria